Harper is an American publishing house, the flagship imprint of global publisher HarperCollins based in New York City.

History

J. & J. Harper (1817–1833)

James Harper and his brother John, printers by training, started their book publishing business J. & J. Harper in New York City in 1817. Their two brothers, Joseph Wesley and Fletcher, joined them in the mid-1820s.

Harper & Brothers (1833–1962)

The company changed its name to "Harper & Brothers" in 1833. The headquarters of the publishing house was located at 331 Pearl Street, facing Franklin Square in Lower Manhattan (about where the Manhattan approach to the Brooklyn Bridge lies today).

Harper & Brothers began publishing Harper's New Monthly Magazine in New York City in 1850. The brothers also published Harper's Weekly (starting in New York City in June 1857), Harper's Bazar  (starting in New York City on November 2, 1867), and Harper's Young People (starting in New York City in 1879).

George B. M. Harvey became president of Harper's on November 16, 1899.

Harper's New Monthly Magazine ultimately became Harper's Magazine, now published by the Harper's Magazine Foundation. Harper's Weekly was absorbed by The Independent (New York; later Boston) in 1916, which merged with The Outlook in 1928. Harper's Bazar was sold to William Randolph Hearst in 1913, became Harper's Bazaar, and is now simply Bazaar, published by the Hearst Corporation.

In 1924, Cass Canfield joined Harper & Brothers and held various executive positions until he died in 1986. In 1925, Eugene F. Saxton joined the company as an editor, and he was responsible for publishing many well-known authors, including Edna St. Vincent Millay and Thornton Wilder. In 1935, Edward Aswell moved to Harper & Brothers as an assistant editor of general books and eventually became editor-in-chief. Aswell persuaded Thomas Wolfe to leave Scribner's, and, after Wolfe's death, edited the posthumous novels The Web and the Rock, You Can't Go Home Again, and The Hills Beyond.

Harper & Row (1962–1990) 

In 1962 Harper & Brothers merged with Row, Peterson & Company to become Harper & Row. Harper's religion publishing moved to San Francisco and became Harper San Francisco (now HarperOne) in 1977. Harper & Row acquired Thomas Y. Crowell Co. and J. B. Lippincott & Co. in the 1970s; Crowell and the trade operations of Lippincott were merged into Harper & Row in 1980.  In 1988, Harper & Row purchased the religious publisher Zondervan, including subsidiary Marshall Pickering.

HarperCollins (1990–present)

Rupert Murdoch's News Corporation (now News Corp) acquired Harper & Row in 1987, and William Collins, Sons in 1990.  The names of these two national publishing houses (Harper & Row in the United States and Collins in the United Kingdom) were combined (along with the Harper's torch icon and Collins' fountain icon) to create HarperCollins. The company has since expanded its international reach with further acquisitions of formerly independent publishers. The Harper imprint began being used in place of HarperCollins in 2007.

Paperbacks
After the purchase of Harper & Row by News Corporation, HarperCollins launched a new mass-market paperback line to complement its existing trade paperback Perennial imprint. It was known as Harper Paperbacks from 1990 to 2000, HarperTorch from 2000 to 2006, and Harper from 2007 to the present.

Authors and illustrators (selected)

 Robert C. Binkley
 Jiddu Krishnamurti
 Margaret Wise Brown
 Gwendolyn Brooks
 Agatha Christie
 Paulo Coelho
 Arthur Conan Doyle
 A.B. Frost
 Stephen Fry
 Anna Godbersen
 John Gray
 Zane Grey
 John Gunther
 Thomas Hardy
 Syd Hoff
 Arthur Holmes
 Erin Hunter
 Aldous Huxley
 Henry James
 Crockett Johnson
 Bruce Judson
 Harper Lee
 Martin Luther King Jr.
 Barbara Kingsolver
 Ruth Krauss
 Ursula K. Le Guin
 Armistead Maupin
 André Maurois
 Herman Melville
 Caroline Pafford Miller
 Peter G. Miller
 Dick Morris
 Sarah Palin
 Lincoln Peirce
 Howard Pyle
 Leland M. Roth
 Laura Schlessinger
 Maurice Sendak
 Sara Shepard
 Shel Silverstein
 Betty Smith
 Lemony Snicket
 Howard Spring
 Pierre Teilhard de Chardin
 Mark Twain
 Charles Dudley Warner
 E. B. White
 Simon Winchester
 Laura Ingalls Wilder
 Thornton Wilder
 Richard Wright

See also
 Books in the United States
 Brooks Thomas
 Cyclopædia of Biblical, Theological and Ecclesiastical Literature
 Harper & Row v. Nation Enterprises
 The Long Short Cut

References

Further reading
 
 Barnes, James J. "Edward Lytton Bulwer and the Publishing Firm of Harper & Brothers". American Literature (1966): 35–48. in JSTOR
 D'Amato, Martina. "'The Harper Establishment'; or, How a New York Publishing Giant Was Made".
 Exman, Eugene. The brothers Harper: a unique publishing partnership and its impact upon the cultural life of America from 1817 to 1853 (Harper & Row, 1965)
 
 
 Mellman, John A. (2017), "The Harper Torchbooks Series: A History and Personal Assessment", publishinghistory.com.

Primary sources

External links

Official website (US)
Official website (UK) 
The Harper Brothers Founders of Harper Brothers Publishing
Finding aid to Harper & Brothers records and Harper & Row Publishers records at Columbia University. Rare Book & Manuscript Library.

Publishing companies established in 1817
Book publishing companies based in New York (state)
Publishing companies disestablished in 1962
HarperCollins books